Danny Harf is an American professional wakeboarder and sports video producer.

Early life 
Harf was born in Visalia, California but then later moved down to Orlando, Florida where he grew up on Lake Willis where he learned to water ski. He found his passion with wakeboarding at age 10. Six years later in the year 2000 he became a wakeboard pro at age 16.

Career Highlights
Harf won the Transworld Wakeboarding Rookie of the Year award in 2000 and is a four-time X Games champion.  His film, Defy, is a wakeboarding movie that shows one of the first ever double backflips ever done on a wakeboard.

Tournament wins and awards 
2012: Ronix Best Video of the Year
2009: Brostock - 1st place
2008: First ever to land 1260°
2006: Pro Wakeboard Tour – 1st place
2006: Pro Wakeboard Tour: Reno – 1st place
2006: Pro Wakeboard Tour: Kelowna – 1st place
2006: Pro Wakeboard Tour: Twin Cities – 1st place
2006: U.S. Masters – 1st place
2005: WWA National Championships – 1st place
2005: Pro Wakeboard Tour: Portland – 1st place
2005: Pro Wakeboard Tour: Fort Worth – 1st place
2005: X Games – 1st place
2004: Pro Wakeboard Tour: Orlando – 1st place
2004: U.S. Masters – 1st place
2003: U.S. Masters – 1st place
2003: WWA National Championships – 1st place
2003: X Games – 1st place
2002: X Games – 1st place
2001: X Games – 1st place
2000: Pro Wakeboard Tour: Oklahoma City – 1st place
2000: Rookie of the Year

Sponsors
Danny rides with over 8 sponsors now and those sponsors are Nautiques, Ronix, Monster Energy, Fox, Reef, Billabong, Spy Optic, Performance Ski & Surf.

The level of sponsorship that Harf has is the highest source of sponsorship it is what people consider to be "pro riders". Harf's natural talent and progressive riding style are only matched by his consistency to stick his tricks reached this level of sponsorship at the young age of 15. Ever since then he has accumulated many sponsors including Ronix, Nautique, Fox, Monster Energy, Spy, Reef, Billabong Wetsuits and Performance Ski & Surf. 
Harf was able to get these sponsors by showing up at events and doing his best. Only the riders who are winning the biggest events, appearing in the big videos, and are all over the magazines get these sponsorships. These riders who have these sponsorships usually have complicated contracts, many obligations, and wake-boarding is their full-time job. These sponsors are usually the hardest to obtain.

Monster Energy started sponsoring Harf back in 2006. 
He has been with Spy apparel brand since 2005.

Danny Harf's Defy 
Directed and filmed by: Sean Kilgus
Saturday December 18, 2011 was the premier for Defy in Orlando at the Beacham Theater. The Film was sponsored by Transworld Wakeboading, Fox, Nautique boats, TIge boats, and System 2.0

Erik Ruck rides with Danny and met him at a wakeboard tourney in 1999 where they became friends.

Shawn Watson, Brian Grubb, Parks Bonifay, Shane Bonifay, Chad Sharpe, Nick Weinacker and Francois Roy came together to make "Pointless Productions" which was a group they had formed and made a video called "Incomplete" to display that they currently were the best wakeboarders out there
Danny was the first, and only rider to do a 1260 degree spin behind boat, in 2008.
Danny rides a Ronix wakeboard throughout the whole movie
The crew that Danny rides with in Defy consists of Jimmy Lariche, Bob Soven, Parks Bonifay, Adam Errington, Rusty Malinosky, and Shaun Murray
20 miles outside of Seattle is where Danny's favorite riding spot and also serves for his teams training lake at Radar Lake. They set up a 100 ft pool beside Radar during the movie and use a ramp to transfer to and from the lake

After Radar Lake's session is done they head down to Mexico to wakeboard. The next stop of filming, the crew headed down to Australia and tried wake boarding on the waves of Australia by using a jet ski to tow the riders into the wave. After their trip to Australia they head on back to Radar Lake again to wakeboard there again. They also decide to add wake skating to the equation about 45 minutes into the video and do a segment of people riding and doing tricks on wake skates.

Soundtrack for Defy
Overture (Tron) - Daft Punk from trailer
Kids - Sleigh Bells - from trailer
Fabrication - Emalkay

Radar Lake 
Danny Harf's favorite practice location is Radar Lake.

Radar Lake is located in Woodinville, Washington and is one of the first man-made lakes built specifically for water sports. The land it is built on was initially bought and developed by water sports innovator Herb O'Brien in 1972. O'Brien, drawing from his water sport experiences as a young man, envisioned Radar Lake to be an isolated and private area where enthusiasts could come and enjoy not only the thrill of the sport but also the pristine natural environment. In 1976, the property was bought by Seattle based owner of Seattle Electric, now Radar Inc.,Wilbur McPherson who gave it its current name in honor of his company. McPherson and O'Brien maintained a close relationship, and O'Brien bought Radar Lake back from McPherson in 2000. McPherson continued to live on the property, along with O'Brien and their respective families, until he lost his life to cancer in 2007.

Herb O'Brien died in 2012, but his family continues to manage the property as Radar Events, LLC.

References

American wakeboarders
Living people
Year of birth missing (living people)